Henryk Górecki: String Quartet No. 3 ('...songs are sung') is a studio album by the Kronos Quartet, containing the last string quartet by Polish composer Henryk Górecki. The Kronos Quartet had recorded Górecki's other string quartets on Henryk Mikolaj Górecki: Already It Is Dusk/"Lerchenmusik" (1991) and on Henryk Górecki: String Quartets Nos. 1 and 2 (1993).

Track listing

Critical reception
The album was an "Editor's Choice" for Strings magazine, which called it "a solemn, spiritual, and revolutionary work."

Credits

Musicians
David Harrington – violin
John Sherba – violin
Hank Dutt – viola
Jeffrey Zeigler – cello

Production
Recorded August 1–3, 2006 at Skywalker Sound, Nicasio, California
Leslie Ann Jones – engineer
Dann Thompson – assistant engineer
Robert Hurwitz – executive producer
Frank Olinsky – art direction, design
Keith Carter – cover photograph

See also
List of 2007 albums

References

Kronos Quartet albums
2007 classical albums
Nonesuch Records albums